Brad Oldroyd (born 5 November 1973) is an Australian cricketer. He played thirty first-class matches for Western Australia between 1995/96 and 2001/02.

See also
 List of Western Australia first-class cricketers

References

External links
 

1973 births
Living people
Australian cricketers
Western Australia cricketers